The 2012–13 season was the 102nd season in Hajduk Split's history and their twenty-second in the Prva HNL. Their 2nd-place finish in the 2011–12 season means it was their 22nd successive season playing in the Prva HNL.

First-team squad

Competitions

Overall record

Prva HNL

League table

Results summary

Results by round

Results by opponent

Source: 2012–13 Croatian First Football League article

Matches

Friendlies

Pre-season

On-season

Mid-season

Prva HNL

Source: HRnogomet.com

Croatian Football Cup

Source: HRnogomet.com

Europa League

Second qualifying round

Third qualifying round 

Source: uefa.com

Player seasonal records
Competitive matches only. Updated to games played 26 May 2013.

Top scorers

Source: Competitive matches

Disciplinary record
Includes all competitive matches. Players with 1 card or more included only.

Sources: Prva-HNL.hr, UEFA.com

Appearances and goals

Sources: Prva-HNL.hr, UEFA.com

Transfers

In

Out

Loans in

Loans out

Sources: nogometni-magazin.com

Notes

References

2012-13
Croatian football clubs 2012–13 season
2012–13 UEFA Europa League participants seasons